The Play-offs to the 2. divisjon in association football took place from 2000 up to and including the 2010 season.

The play-offs were instituted because of the streamlining of the 2. divisjon ahead of the 2001 season. It was reduced from eight to four groups, and thus, not all winners of the 3. divisjon groups could be promoted.

From the 2011 season, the 3. divisjon was streamlined to have twelve groups, where the winners are promoted to the four groups of the 2. divisjon, whence three teams (on average) in each of the four 2. divisjon groups are relegated to the 3. divisjon.

2010
Nesodden beat Korsvoll 3–2 on aggregate
Hasle-Løren beat Lillestrøm 2 5–2 on aggregate
Elverum beat Gjøvik 5–2 on aggregate
Kvik Halden beat Eik Tønsberg 5–1 on aggregate
Mandalskameratene beat Skarphedin 6–2 on aggregate
Viking 2 beat Staal Jørpeland 5–4 on aggregate
Austevoll beat Voss 5–3 on aggregate
Jevnaker beat Tornado Måløy 5–1 on aggregate
Herd beat Sunndal 8–2 on aggregate
Tiller beat Stjørdals-Blink 6–4 on aggregate
Mjølner beat Stålkameratene 8–2 on aggregate
Skarp beat Kirkenes 7–4 on aggregate

Reference: Fotballen.eu

2009
Oslo City beat Høland 6–2 on aggregate
Frigg beat Lommedalen 13–3 on aggregate
Brumunddal beat Flisa 3–2 on aggregate
Ørn-Horten beat Kvik Halden on the away goals rule; 3–3 on aggregate
Odd 2 beat Jerv 9–3 on aggregate
Vidar beat Viking 2 9–7 on aggregate (after extra time)
Os beat Austevoll  4–3 on aggregate
Førde  beat Birkebeineren 5–3 on aggregate
Aalesund 2 beat Træff 5–3 on aggregate
Kolstad  beat Charlottenlund  7–2 on aggregate
Harstad  beat Stålkameratene 3–2 on aggregate
Senja beat Kirkenes  3–1 on aggregate

Reference: Fotballen.eu

2008
Ullern beat Oslo City 4–2 on aggregate
KFUM Oslo beat Høland 5–2 on aggregate
FF Lillehammer beat Flisa 3–2 on aggregate
Fram Larvik beat Kvik Halden 4–1 on aggregate
Åskollen beat Førde 8–3 on aggregate
Start 2 beat Odd 2 9–4 on aggregate
Kopervik beat Klepp 5–2 on aggregate
Stord beat Brann 2 3–2 on aggregate
Molde 2 beat Aalesund 2 3–0 on aggregate
Nardo beat Tiller 4–2 on aggregate
Bodø/Glimt 2 beat Harstad 6–5 on aggregate (after extra time)
Bossekop beat Skjervøy 4–1 on aggregate

Reference: Fotballen.eu

2007
Lyn 2 beat Frigg 7–4 on aggregate
Skjetten beat Grüner 14–0 on aggregate
Valdres beat Ham-Kam 2 5–4 on aggregate
Østsiden beat Fram Larvik 3–1 on aggregate
Strømsgodset 2 beat Årdal 7–1 on aggregate
Vindbjart beat Tollnes 9–2 on aggregate
Randaberg beat Kopervik 7–2 on aggregate
Nest-Sotra beat Trio 7–4 on aggregate
Skarbøvik beat Træff 7–2 on aggregate
KIL/Hemne beat Verdal 2–1 on aggregate
Lofoten beat Innstranden 4–3 on aggregate
Senja beat Kirkenes 9–3 on aggregate

Reference: Fotballen.eu

2006
Fredrikstad 2 beat Kvik Halden 3–2 on aggregate
Strømmen beat Ullern 8–6 on aggregate
Mjøndalen beat Elverum on the away goals rule, 4–4 on aggregate
FF Lillehammer beat Stryn on the away goals rule, 1–1 on aggregate
Asker beat Sandefjord 2 5–4 on aggregate
FK Arendal beat Urædd 5–1 on aggregate
Stavanger beat Vidar 6–1 on aggregate
Os beat Hovding 4–3 on aggregate
Averøykameratene beat Skarbøvik 5–4 on aggregate
Nardo beat Verdal 3–1 on aggregate
Mjølner beat Fauske/Sprint 4–2 on aggregate
Tromsø 2 beat Porsanger 11–5 on aggregate

Reference: Fotballen.eu

2005
Vålerenga 2 beat Fredrikstad 2 7–4 on aggregate
Korsvoll  beat Elverum  4–3 on aggregate
Åmot  beat Asker  4–3 on aggregate
Hamkam 2 beat Stryn  6–5 on aggregate
Stabæk 2 beat Skarphedin 11–1 on aggregate
Start 2 beat Eik-Tønsberg 4–3 on aggregate
Kopervik  beat Randaberg  on the away goals rule; 2–2 on aggregate
Askøy  beat Voss 5–1 on aggregate
Kristiansund  beat Volda  4–2 on aggregate
KIL/Hemne beat Nardo  3–1 on aggregate
Steigen  beat Mjølner 2–1 on aggregate
Hammerfest  beat Tromsø 2 6–3 on aggregate

2004
Brumunddal  beat Strømmen  3–2 on aggregate
Sarpsborg  beat KFUM Oslo 3–0 on aggregate
FF Lillehammer beat Førde  7–3 on aggregate
Groruddalen  beat Jevnaker  7–2 on aggregate
Notodden  beat Mjøndalen  5–1 on aggregate
Flekkerøy  beat Eik-Tønsberg 6–3 on aggregate
Egersund beat Randaberg  4–2 on aggregate
Stord/Moster beat Nest-Sotra 3–2 on aggregate
Træff beat Skarbøvik  4–2 on aggregate
Ranheim  beat Stjørdals-Blink 7–5 on aggregate
Innstranden beat Grovfjord 8–1 on aggregate
Lyngen/Karnes beat Bossekop 4–3 on aggregate

2003
Sparta beat Notodden 8–1 on aggregate
Drøbak/Frogn beat Groruddalen 1–0 on aggregate
Elverum beat Jevnaker on the away goals rule; 3–3 on aggregate
Jotun beat Brumunddal 2–1 on aggregate
FK Arendal beat Eik-Tønsberg 3–1 on aggregate
Donn beat Asker 5–4 on aggregate
Sandnes beat Buøy 5–4 on aggregate
Norheimsund beat Stord/Moster 4–3 on aggregate
Volda beat Træff on penalties; 3–3 on aggregate
Kolstad beat Orkla 6–3 on aggregate
Harstad beat Innstranden 5–2 on aggregate
Salangen beat Båtsfjord 6–2 on aggregate

2002
Mercantile beat Mjøndalen 6–1 on aggregate
Borg Fotball beat Grei 7–1 on aggregate
Lillestrøm 2 beat Brumunddal 12–1 on aggregate
Gjøvik-Lyn beat Jotun 8–3 on aggregate
Odd 2 beat Arendal 5–3 on aggregate
Runar beat Sarpsborg 4–1 on aggregate
Ålgård beat Vaulen 8–4 on aggregate
Hovding beat Trott 7–0 on aggregate
Averøykameratene beat Bergsøy 6–1 on aggregate
Nidelv beat Nardo 5–2 on aggregate
Narvik beat Steigen 6–1 on aggregate
Bossekop beat Lyngen/Karnes 7–5 on aggregate

2001
Follo beat Lillestrøm 2 2–1 on aggregate
Grindvoll beat Nittedal 5–2 on aggregate
Frigg beat Moss 2 2–1 on aggregate
Elverum beat Stryn 7–4 on aggregate
Jerv beat Birkebeineren 4–2 on aggregate
Larvik beat Vindbjart 3–2 on aggregate
Klepp beat Vedavåg Karmøy 6–3 on aggregate
Brann 2 beat Radøy on the away goals rule, 3–3 on aggregate
Langevåg beat Dahle on the away goals rule, 5–5 on aggregate
Levanger beat Nidelv 3–2 on aggregate
Vesterålen beat Innstranden 6–4 on aggregate
Salangen beat Porsanger 5–2 on aggregate

Reference: Speaker.no

2000
In 2000, there was a three-way playoff between teams from both the 2. divisjon and the 3. divisjon. One team prevailed (with green background in the table), the other two were either relegated or stayed in the 3. divisjon. All the three-way matches, with one exception, were contested between one 2. divisjon and two 3. divisjon teams.

Reference: RSSSF

References

Norwegian Second Division
2000 establishments in Norway
2010 disestablishments in Norway